Jermaine Ainsley (born 8 August 1995) is an Australian professional rugby union footballer who currently plays as a prop for the Melbourne Rebels in the Super Rugby competition after previously being with the .

Early life
Born and raised in New Zealand, Ainsley moved to Western Australia in search of his big break in the game. He represented Western Australia at under-20 level before turning out for the 's A team.   He played an important role in the Nedlands club's victory in the  Pindan RugbyWA Premier Grade competition in 2015.

Rugby career
He played in nine matches in total for the Spirit in 2015, starting two of them and this secured him a spot in the Western Force's wider training group ahead of the 2016 Super Rugby season.

Injuries to props Tetera Faulkner and Francois van Wyk gave Ainsley the opportunity to earn valuable game time during his debut campaign. He earned his first cap in Round 1 against the Melbourne Rebels and played in nine of the Force's fifteen matches that year, one of which was as a starter. This form earned him a new 2-year contract to keep him at the Force until 2018.

After the Force were excluded from the Super rugby competition, Ainsley moved to join the Melbourne Rebels in 2018 and, later that year, signed an extended deal with the club to stay in Melbourne through to 2020.

Super Rugby statistics

References

1995 births
Living people
Australia international rugby union players
Australian rugby union players
Highlanders (rugby union) players
Melbourne Rebels players
Melbourne Rising players
New Zealand emigrants to Australia
New Zealand rugby union players
Otago rugby union players
People educated at Otago Boys' High School
Perth Spirit players
Rugby union players from Cromwell, New Zealand
Rugby union props
Western Force players